Ivano Alberto Fossati (born 21 September 1951) is an Italian pop singer from Genoa. He was a member of the progressive rock group Delirium and has worked with Fabrizio De André, Riccardo Tesi, Anna Oxa, Mia Martini, Ornella Vanoni, Shirley Bassey, Francesco De Gregori, Menudo and Mina.

In October 2011, after the release of the album Decadancing, Fossati announced during Fabio Fazio's TV show Che tempo che fa that he decided to end his music career: "I've been thinking a lot about it, not in the last days, but during last two or three years. This will be my last album, and I won't record any new album. And my next tour will be the last one". Fossati's last concert was held at the Teatro Piccolo in Milan, on 19 March 2012.

Discography
Il grande mare che avremmo traversato (1973)
Poco prima dell'aurora (with Oscar Prudente; 1974)
Good-bye Indiana (1975)
La casa del serpente (1977)
La mia banda suona il rock (1979)
Panama e dintorni (1981)
Le città di frontiera (1983)
Ventilazione (1984)
700 giorni (1986)
La pianta del te (1988)
Discanto (1990)
Lindbergh (1992)
Buontempo dal vivo Vol. 1 (1993)
Carte da decifrare dal Vivo Vol. 2 (1993)
Macramé (1996)
Canzoni a raccolta – Time and Silence (1998)
La disciplina della Terra (2000)
Not One Word (2001)
Lampo viaggiatore (2003)
Dal vivo, Vol. 3: Tour Acustico (2004)
L'arcangelo (2006)
Ho sognato una strada (2006)
Musica moderna (2008)
Decadancing (2011)
Mina Fossati (2019)

As contributor
Scacchi e tarocchi (by Francesco De Gregori, 1985)
Euphonia (by Vincenzo Zitello, 1986)
Anime salve (by Fabrizio De André, 1996)
Les Annees Orlando l'Integrale 1970–1997 (by Dalida, 1997)
Veleno (by Mina, 2003)
Acqua foco e vento (by Riccardo Tesi, 2003)
Miei compagni di viaggio (by Mia Martini, 2003)
Troppo tempo/Hace tiempo (by Laura Pausini, 2011)

External links
Ivano Fossati on Europopmusic.eu (English)

References

1951 births
Living people
Musicians from Genoa
Italian singer-songwriters
Italian record producers
Ciak d'oro winners